The discography of Japanese singer Ami Nakashima, better known as Dream Ami, consists of one studio album, seven singles (including one as featured artist), and eight music videos.

Studio albums

Singles

As lead artist

As featured artist

Other appearances

Music videos

See also 
Dream discography
E-girls discography

Notes

References

External links 
 Dream Ami discography

Discographies of Japanese artists
Pop music discographies